The class WDS-1 was a diesel-electric locomotive used by Indian Railways for shunting and doing departmental works. The model name stands for broad gauge (W), Diesel (D), Shunting (S) 1st generation (1). The WDS-1 is used mostly in the Northern Railway Zone (NR). All these locomotives were withdrawn by the late 1990s.

History 
During WW2 the USATC took effective control of the ports of Bombay, Calcutta and Karachi and to operate them obtained 50 General Electric built Bo-Bo diesel locos; these were a standard General Electric 45 ton design of locomotive. When delivered to India the locos were split between the BAR, BB&CIR, GIPR and NWR and were used for working military traffic between the ports and mainline railways. After the war they became the property of the mainline railways and in turn became IR locos. Post war they were designated as ADE class and on IR they were WDS-1 class. One unidentified member of the class has been preserved and is now at the DLW, Varanasi.

Upon the departure of the Americans, the locos all became part of the stocks of their respective companies. In 8/1947 14 of the locos became the property Pakistan. Unsurprisingly all the NWR examples were among these along with two each from BBCIR (6500-01), GIPR (6526-27) and the BAR pair. They became their ADE36 class with the running numbers 6501 to 6514. The ones that remained in India became ADE class locos and were numbered 410 to 425. All but one of these 15 became WDS-1 class locos and received the numbers 19000 to 14. The missing loco was sold to CLW for use as their works shunter where it remains albeit now preserved. The WDS-1 were another long resilient class as one was in 1992, at Sealdah.

Former shed 

 Gooty (GY): All the locomotives of this class has been withdrawn from service.

See also 

 Rail transport in India#History
 Locomotives of India
 Rail transport in India
 Indian locomotive class WDM-2

References

Notes

Bibliography

Bo-Bo locomotives
Railway locomotives introduced in 1945
5 ft 6 in gauge locomotives
Diesel-hydraulic locomotives of India
General Electric locomotives